Mikael "Micke" Nilsson (born 24 June 1978) is a Swedish former professional footballer who played as a midfielder and defender. He is best remembered for representing Halmstads BK, Panathinaikos, and Brøndby. A full international between 2002 and 2009, he played 64 matches for Sweden and was a part of their UEFA Euro 2004, 2006 FIFA World Cup, and UEFA Euro 2008 squads.

Club career
Nilsson started his career with Ovesholms IF, where he stayed until 1998 when he moved to Åhus Horna BK. He played for the club for only one season before moving to Halmstads BK in 2000. His first season was mostly spent on the bench, but eventually he became one of the team's more important players until, during the 2004 season, he was sold to English club Southampton.

At Southampton, he was not able to establish himself as a regular member of the first team and in 2005 he was sold to Greek club Panathinaikos.

On 4 March 2008, he stated that when returning to Sweden he would play for Halmstads BK, but he would live in Malmö since he wanted to live in a larger city.

On 8 April 2009, Nilsson announced a transfer to Brøndby IF. He signed a three-year contract and will move to the club on 1 July 2009.

Nilsson's Brøndby contract expired on 30 June 2012 after which Nilsson left the club following three years playing as both a right back, midfielder and occasionally right midfielder. In his last six months at Brøndby, Nilsson did not play much as Brøndby did not see Nilsson as part of the club's future.

In August 2012 he agreed to play for the Copenhagen-based club Fremad Amager due to the new assigned coach Per F. Hansen, as he was the former assistant coach of Brøndby IF. Although on 8 August 2012, Nilsson officially announced his retirement as a player.

International career

He has played in the Sweden national team since 20 November 2002, when he made his debut against the Czech Republic in which he scored two goals in a 3–3 draw. He has been a part of Sweden's squad to the UEFA Euro 2004, 2006 FIFA World Cup and UEFA Euro 2008, mainly playing as a defender.

He started out as a midfielder, but once when the national team lacked defenders, Nilsson was moved back, since then he generally played as a defender for the national team.

During the 2010 FIFA World Cup qualification Sweden changed to 3–5–2 formation, placing Nilsson again on the midfield. On 6 June 2009, Sweden played a 2010 FIFA World Cup qualifying match against Denmark at the Råsunda Stadium in Solna. Nilsson made a terrible mistake that caused Sweden to lose 0–1 and eventually miss the World Cup. A cross came in from the right and Nilsson was going to clear it out of Swedish penalty area. He was not under pressure when the ball came. Somehow, he managed to get the ball on his left leg, causing it to roll across the goal-line and to the Danish midfielder Thomas Kahlenberg who scored easily.

Following Sweden's failure to reach the 2010 FIFA World Cup, Nilsson announced his retirement from international football, stating he would not be able to balance playing for both Brøndby IF and the Sweden national team.

Career statistics

International 
Appearances and goals by national team and year

International goals

Honours
Halmstads BK
Allsvenskan: 2000

References

External links
 
 
 
 

1978 births
Living people
UEFA Euro 2004 players
2006 FIFA World Cup players
UEFA Euro 2008 players
Allsvenskan players
Expatriate footballers in England
Expatriate footballers in Greece
Expatriate men's footballers in Denmark
Halmstads BK players
Super League Greece players
Panathinaikos F.C. players
Premier League players
Southampton F.C. players
Danish Superliga players
Brøndby IF players
Swedish footballers
Sweden international footballers
Swedish expatriate footballers
Fremad Amager players
Association football midfielders
Swedish expatriate sportspeople in England
Swedish expatriate sportspeople in Greece
Swedish expatriate sportspeople in Denmark
People from Kristianstad Municipality
Footballers from Skåne County